Eucalyptus nicholii, commonly known as the narrow-leaved black peppermint or willow peppermint, is a species of small to medium-sized tree that is endemic to New South Wales. It has thick, rough, fibrous bark on the trunk and branches, small, narrow adult leaves, flower buds arranged in groups of seven, white flowers and small, hemispherical, bell-shaped or conical fruit.

Description
It has thick, rough, fibrous, yellowish-brown to grey-brown bark with red-brown underlayers. The bark is coarsely fissured on the trunk and branches, but the outer branches sometimes have smooth bark that is shed in short ribbons. Flowering occurs from late summer to early autumn and the flowers are white.

Taxonomy and naming
Eucalyptus nicholii was first formally described in 1929 by Joseph Maiden and William Blakely in Maiden's book, A Critical Revision of the genus Eucalyptus. The specific epithet honours Maiden's private secretary and "Chief Clerk, Botanic Gardens", Richard Nicol.<ref name="Maiden">{{cite book |last1=Maiden |first1=Joseph |title=A Critical Revision of the genus Eucalyptus' ' (Volume 8) |date=1929 |publisher=New South Wales Government Printer |location=Sydney |pages=52–53 |url=https://www.biodiversitylibrary.org/item/123314#page/82/mode/1up |access-date=2 August 2019}}</ref>

Distribution and habitat
The narrow-leaved black peppermint grows in shallow, relatively infertile soils overlying shale and slate bedrock usually as part of grassy or sclerophyll woodlands, in association with Eucalyptus andrewsii and Eucalyptus caliginosa. Its distribution is limited to the Northern Tablelands, New South Wales, particularly in the Walcha to Tenterfield, area and to the east. The species is sparsely distributed, but most commonly occurs in the central areas of its range.

Conservation status
This eucalyptus is listed as "vulnerable" under the Australian Government Environment Protection and Biodiversity Conservation Act 1999 and the New South Wales Government Biodiversity Conservation Act 2016''. Most specimens occur on private property or on roadsides and few are conserved in nature reserves. The main threats to the species are land clearing and habitat fragmentation, inappropriate fire regimes, grazing by livestock and feral goats, road maintenance and collection of firewood. The entire population is known from fewer than 40 localities, with most not reserved in national parks or state forests.

Use in horticulture
This tree is very widely planted as an ornamental in southeastern Australia, the fine, dense foliage being particularly attractive.

See also

List of Eucalyptus species

References

nicholii
Myrtales of Australia
Trees of Australia
Flora of New South Wales
Ornamental trees
Plants described in 1929
Taxa named by Joseph Maiden
Taxa named by Henry Deane (engineer)